¿Dónde Jugarán los Niños? (English: Where Will the Children Play?) is the second studio album (fifth overall) released by Mexican rock band Maná released in 1992. This album contained many of the hits that catapulted them to international fame and established them as one of the leading Latin rock acts of the 1990s, including "Oye Mi Amor", "¿Dónde Jugarán los Niños?", "Vivir Sin Aire", "Te Llore Un Río", "Cómo te deseo" and "De pies a cabeza". The album has reached #4 on Billboard's Top Latin Albums Chart. Ulises Calleros (the band's former electric guitarist) was replaced by César "Vampiro" López. The band re-released this album with bonus remixes on February 15, 1994. Singer Mijares covered "Vivir sin Aire" in his 2009 Spanish album Vivir Así. "Oye Mi Amor" is one of the international songs included in the rhythm video game Rock Band 3. To date, it has sold more than 10 million copies worldwide, becoming the Best-selling Spanish language rock album of all time.

Track listing

Personnel
Fher Olvera – lead vocal,  electric & acoustic guitars & harmonica, choir
César "Vampiro" López – electric & acoustic guitars
Iván González – synthesizers, acoustic piano & hammond organ
Juan Diego Calleros – bass guitar
Alex González – drums, bass, percussion, main vocal on "Me Vale", choir

Production
Produced By Fher Olvera, Alex González & Jose Quintana
Recorded & Engineered By Benny Faccone

Charts

Sales and certifications

See also
 1992 in Latin music
 List of best-selling Latin albums
 List of best-selling Latin albums in the United States

References

External links
Official site

1992 albums
Maná albums
Warner Music Latina albums
Spanish-language albums